Caitlin O'Heaney (born August 16, 1952) is an American television, film and stage actress. O'Heaney has worked extensively in live theater, but is best known for playing Sarah Stickney White, the female lead on the ABC series Tales of the Gold Monkey in the early 1980s.  She also played Snow White Charming in the first season of ABC's The Charmings in 1987.

Early life
O'Heaney was born in Milwaukee, Wisconsin and raised in Whitefish Bay. Her great-great-great-grandfather is Jacob Best, founder of what became the Pabst Brewing Company. O'Heaney was raised Roman Catholic.

She won a full scholarship to the Juilliard School in New York City when she was 17. Then known as Kathleen Heaney, she was a member of the Juilliard Drama Division's Group 3 (1970–1974) where she studied under Academy Award-winning actor John Houseman.  Her performances at Juilliard included several classic roles, such as Masha in The Seagull; Doreen in Tartuffe; Juliet in Romeo and Juliet; Mary Boyle in Juno and the Paycock; Maryanne in Measure for Measure; and Esmeralda in Camino Real.

Stage career
O'Heaney made her off-Broadway debut as Loretta in The Hot House at the Chelsea Theatre, then remained at the Chelsea to play Finkel in Yentl and to understudy Tovah Feldshuh in the title role.  She moved to Broadway to understudy the role of Elizabeth in A Matter of Gravity, starring Katharine Hepburn and co-starring her Juilliard friend and colleague Christopher Reeve.

She relocated to Seattle to appear as Celia in As You Like It, Gwendolyn in Travesties, and Eylie in Ladyhouse Blues at ACT/Seattle, then returned to New York to play the double roles of Belle and Mrs. Cratchit in A Christmas Carol at Playwrights Horizon. When A Christmas Carol closed, O'Heaney moved to Los Angeles, and five weeks later she was cast as Anna Marie Hollyhock in the 1978 ABC comedy series Apple Pie, which was produced by Norman Lear, directed by Peter Bonerz, and starred Rue McClanahan, Dabney Coleman, Jack Gilford, Derrel Maury, Mike Binder and Richard Libertini. This was a highlight of O'Heaney's career.  She says with regard to the experience, "It was pure magic and incredible fun working every day with these wonderful people!"

O'Heaney remained in Los Angeles to play fourteen-year-old Bianca in White Marriage at the Odyssey Theatre and won a Drama-Logue Award for Best Actress for the role.  She then returned to the East Coast to star as Ersilla Drei in Pirandello's Naked at the Syracuse Stage, and performances in Ape Watch at the Mark Taper Forum Lab and in The Brides at the Lenox Art Centre soon followed.  She appeared off-Broadway as Olive Lashbrook in The Voice of the Turtle, for which she received a very positive review in The New York Times, and in Scenes and Revelations.

Film and television work
O'Heaney appeared in the television movie The Seeding of Sarah Burns in 1979 and as waitress Lurleen Hamett in ABC's One Life to Live. She played the female lead, Amy, in the horror feature He Knows You're Alone (1980), which was Tom Hanks' first feature film. In 1982, she was cast in the lead female role of Sarah Stickney White in ABC's Tales of the Gold Monkey, also starring Stephen Collins, Roddy McDowall and Jeff MacKay. She also appeared as 1930s Hollywood actress Dolores Farrar in Woody Allen's 1983 film Zelig, and Allen would cast her again in The Purple Rose of Cairo in 1985. She played Miss Farmer in the 1987 film Three O'Clock High.

Although she was active in television until 1993, O'Heaney did not appear in any feature films for nearly two decades, then returned in 2002 as Mrs. Woodbridge in The Emperor's Club with Kevin Kline, O'Heaney's colleague and friend at Juilliard. She also played Aunt Fran in the 2005 film Brooklyn Lobster, and most recently appeared in the 2007 independent feature Asylum Seekers.
O'Heaney wrapped the feature film Late Phases, a thriller directed by Adrian Garcia Bogliano, in June 2013 in which she played the role of Emma.

Other work and interests
In the mid-1970s, Salvador Dalí offered Caitlin the opportunity to model for him, but Gala, his wife, was not in favor of the project so it was canceled.

O'Heaney lists her interests as the environment, performing as an actress in theatre, film, television, animal rights, writing, music, singing, reading, and the design of fragrance. She used her interest in fragrance to create Caitlin, a cruelty-free fragrance containing gardenia, apple, sandalwood and patchouli.  InStyle magazine reported that the fragrance was favored by Naomi Judd, Rosanna Arquette, Terri Hatcher and Paula Abdul.

In 2006-2007, O'Heaney performed on radio with Air Pirates Radio Theater.
  
In February 2008, she wrote the music and lyrics for an anti-war environmentalist song titled "Who Have We Freed?" which she recorded with Pete Seeger.  She and Seeger have performed "Who Have We Freed?" at various environmental/anti-war festivals in and around New York.

O'Heaney is involved with independent playwrights at Manhattan Theatre Source and the National Arts Club, both in New York City.

Personal life
O'Heaney had a lengthy relationship with Jared Martin, who played Dusty Farlow on Dallas, and the two remained friendly after their romantic relationship ended.

Filmography
Film

Television

References

External links
 

Actresses from Wisconsin
American film actresses
American television actresses
Juilliard School alumni
People from Whitefish Bay, Wisconsin
1953 births
Living people
21st-century American women